Mabel Velarde (born 4 December 1988) is an Ecuadorian professional footballer. She was part of the Ecuadorian squad for the 2015 FIFA Women's World Cup.

References

External links
 
 Profile  at FEF
 

1988 births
Living people
Footballers from Quito
Ecuadorian women's footballers
Ecuador women's international footballers
Place of birth missing (living people)
2015 FIFA Women's World Cup players
Women's association football midfielders
Lee Flames women's soccer players
Southeast Missouri State Redhawks women's soccer players
Ecuadorian expatriate sportspeople in the United States
Expatriate women's soccer players in the United States
Ecuadorian expatriate footballers
21st-century Ecuadorian women